Type-In is an arranged meeting of manual typewriting enthusiasts.  A typical Type-In may include the following activities: a typing speed competition; distribution of stationery, envelopes and stamps, followed by a typed letter-writing session; the swapping and purchasing of typewriters.

The first Type-In was held on December 18. 2010, in Philadelphia, at Bridgewater's Pub in 30th Street Station. About a dozen people attended and more than 25 typewriters were on display.  The event was cooked up by Michael McGettigan, owner of a local bicycle shop, Trophy Bikes, and was publicized with posters, emails, and a small mailing to writers, English professors, thrift stores and cafes. The event was also publicized on a blog site, [www.phillytyper.com], posted by McGettigan. The event received media attention all out of proportion to its size. At the start of the event, the media outnumbered the attendees 3-1, though this ratio improved later.

Coverage, especially by the Philadelphia Daily News and the Associated Press, led to other Type-Ins around the U.S. and in Basel, Switzerland. The Type-In name spread casually through the "Typosphere" an already-established band of manual typewriter fans around the U.S. and beyond. Type-Ins have been held in libraries, cafes, and bookstores.

References 

Bruder, Jessica. "Click, Clack, Ding! Sigh...", The New York Times, March 31, 2011, accessed March 31, 2010.
 
 
 
 

Typewriters